The 2020 New Zealand Radio Awards are the awards for excellence in the New Zealand radio industry during 2019. It will be the 43rd New Zealand Radio Awards, recognising staff, volunteers and contractors in both commercial and non-commercial broadcasting.

Due to the lockdown measures in place due to the COVID-19 pandemic, there was no award ceremony. Instead, the winners were announced on 15 May on the Radio Broadcasters Association's website.

Winners and nominees
This is a list of nominees, with winners in bold.|

Associated Craft Award sponsored by RCS

Best Community Campaign sponsored by NZME

Best Content sponsored by Radio New Zealand

Best Hosts

Best New Broadcaster sponsored by Ara NZ Broadcasting School

Best News & Sport

Best Programmes sponsored by NZ On Air

Best Promotion

Best Radio Creative sponsored by The Radio Bureau

Sales Team of the Year sponsored by MediaWorks

Station of the Year sponsored by GfK

'The Blackie Award'

The Johnny Douglas Award

Sir Paul Holmes Broadcaster of the Year

Outstanding Contribution to Radio

Services to Broadcasting

References

New Zealand Radio Awards